Microsoft Digital Image was a digital image editing program created by Microsoft. It was a successor to Microsoft Picture It!

Microsoft Digital Image came in three different editions: Digital Image Standard, which offered tools for editing images, Digital Image Suite, which added Digital Image Library for organizing images and Digital Image Suite Plus, which included tools from Digital Image Suite and the video editing tools of Pinnacle Studio. Digital Image had support for Adobe Photoshop plugins. Later versions also included Photo Story 3.1.

The latest version of this product was Digital Image 2006. This version had native support for Raw camera formats from Canon and Nikon On 19 September 2006, Microsoft released an "anniversary edition" which offered Windows Vista compatibility, removed raw support, added support for Extensible Metadata Platform (XMP) metadata.

The software product was generally well received and praised for its ease of use.

On 15 June 2007, Microsoft announced that the Microsoft Digital Image suite would be discontinued because most of the feature set in the Digital Image suite of applications had been integrated into newer Microsoft titles and services, including Windows Photo Gallery.

References

External links 
 

Discontinued Microsoft software